Cinnamon Gardens ( Kurundu Vaththa) is an affluent neighbourhood in Colombo, Sri Lanka located 3 kilometers south-east from Colombo's centre. Cinnamon Gardens is named from the former cinnamon plantation in this area.

At present, Cinnamon Gardens is the location of the Prime Minister's Office, Independence Hall, Colombo Town Hall and National Museum as well as numerous foreign embassies and high commissions, located down streets lined with fine trees and mansions that are home to the country's elite.

It is also the location of the Colombo Department of Meteorology and its observatory.

Demographic
Cinnamon Gardens is a multi-religious and multi-ethnic area. The major ethnic communities in Cinnamon Gardens are Sinhalese and Tamils. Ethnic minorities include Burghers and Sri Lankan Moors. Religions include Buddhism, Hinduism, Islam, Christianity and various other religions and beliefs to a lesser extent.

Schools

 Bishop's College (Sri Lanka)
Buddhist Ladies' College
Carey College, Colombo
Colombo International School
D. S. Senanayake College
Ladies' College, Colombo
Musaeus College
Royal College Colombo
Sirimavo Bandaranaike Vidyalaya
St Bridget's Convent, Colombo
Thurstan College
Wycherley International School
Stafford International School

Universities
University of Colombo
University of the Visual & Performing Arts

Sporting venues
Singhalese Sports Club Cricket Ground
Royal College Sports Complex
 D.S. Senanayake College Sports Complex
 Thurstan College Cricket Grounds
 Bloomfield Cricket and Athletic Club
 Ceylonese Rugby & Football Club Grounds
 Colombo Cricket Club Ground
 Colombo Racecourse

Buildings
Lighthouse
Jefferson House
Arcade Independence Square

Places of interest 

 National Museum of Colombo
Viharamahadevi Park
 Nelum Pokuna Mahinda Rajapaksa Theatre
 SSC Cricket Ground
 Colombo Race Course
 Arcade Independence Square
 Independence Square
 Colombo Municipal Council (Town Hall)
Colombo public Library
 BMICH
 Planetarium
 National Art Gallery, Sri Lanka
 World War Memorial Park
 Lionel Wendt Art Centre

Diplomatic missions

High Commission of Australia
High Commission of Canada
Royal Embassy of Netherlands
High Commission of South Africa
Embassy of Iran 
Embassy of China
Embassy of Vietnam
Embassy of Qatar
Embassy of the Republic of France
Embassy of Indonesia
Embassy of Japan
Embassy of Kuwait
Embassy of Myanmar (Burma)
Embassy of the Islamic Republic of Pakistan
Embassy of Romania
Embassy of Russia
Embassy of the Kingdom of Saudi Arabia
Embassy of Switzerland
Embassy of the United Arab Emirates
High Commission of the United Kingdom
Royal Embassy of Thailand
High Commission of Bangladesh
Embassy of Brazil
Embassy of Libya
Embassy of the Republic of South Korea

Gallery

See also
 Rajakeeya Mawatha
 Kumarathunga Munidasa Mawatha

References

Districts of Colombo
Populated places in Western Province, Sri Lanka